Glabrennea silhouettensis is a species of air-breathing land snail, a terrestrial pulmonate gastropod mollusk in the family Streptaxidae.

Distribution 
Glabrennea silhouettensis is endemic to the Mt. Dauban on the Silhouette Island in the Seychelles.

References

Streptaxidae
Gastropods described in 1994